Topias Palmi (born August 26, 1994) is a Finnish professional basketball player who last played for Limburg United of the BNXT League. A 194 cm tall guard, Palmi last played for Vanoli Cremona of the LBA.

In 2013 FIBA Europe Under-20 Championship Division B game against Luxembourg, Palmi scored 60 points and broke the old record of any Finnish national basketball team with 17 points margin.

Professional career
On June 27, 2019, he has signed multi-year deal with Vanoli Cremona of the LBA.

After the Vanoli Cremona financial difficulties at the end of 2019–20 season that put the entire club into bankruptcy risk, Palmi was the only player who was confirmed for the following 2020–21 season. However he parted way with Cremona four games before the natural conclusion of the competition in order to attend some medical scrutinies in Finland. Palmi joined Tampereen Pyrintö in 2021 and averaged 17.7 points, 4.2 rebounds, and 2.4 assists per game. On December 9, 2021, Palmi signed with Limburg United of the BNXT League.

Trophies and awards
Finnish Championship 2014
Finnish Cup 2013
Baltic Basketball League: fourth 2014

References

External links
Topias Palmi Finnish Basketball Association
Topias Palmi Eurobasket.com

1994 births
Living people
Finnish men's basketball players
Kataja BC players
Lega Basket Serie A players
Limburg United players
Sportspeople from Tampere
Tampereen Pyrintö players
Vanoli Cremona players